Hardscrabble, California may refer to:
 Freshwater, California
 Ione, California